Joseph Kevin Fanning (born 24 September 1970) is a Group 1 winning Irish jockey. He has won races at every flat racecourse in Great Britain and has twice been All-Weather Champion Jockey. Since the 1990s, he has been stable jockey to Mark Johnston, for whom he has won most of his races.

Career

Fanning was born in Dublin, but grew up in Roundwood County Wicklow. He graduated from the Irish Racing Academy in 1986 and took a few rides for Irish trainer Kevin Connolly. 

In 1988, he moved to England to work for trainer Tommy 'Squeak' Fairhurst in Middleham, Yorkshire, for whom he rode his first winner, over jumps, in a four-runner hurdle at Sedgefield. He broke two neck vertebrae in a fall at Newcastle after only three months and switched to flat racing. In 1990, he won his first flat race and within two seasons had lost his apprentice's claim. He now believes he was too light to have been a jump jockey in the first place.

Without an apprentice claim, it was more difficult for him to win races, although he won the 1993 Northumberland Plate for trainer George Moore on Highflying. As a result, he began to ride out for another Middleham trainer, Mark Johnston. The pair first connected in 1990, although it wasn't until 1996 that the connection became strong. In 1998, he won his first Listed race, the Tote Silver Tankard at Pontefract for Johnston.

The following year, he won his first Group race, the Group 3 September Stakes at Epsom on Yavana's Pace, a horse on which he would also win the Prix Gladiateur at Longchamp two years later, almost to the day. He was also second twice in the Irish St Leger on Yavana’s Pace - in both 1999 and 2000.

Darasim was his first Group 2 winner, taking the Prix Kergolay in August 2003. The horse would later provide other big race victories in the 2003 Prix Gladiateur, the 2004 Betty Barclay Rennen in Germany, and the 2004 Goodwood Cup. In 2004, he secured more than £1 million in British prize money in a season for the first time.  

In 2006, he passed 100 winners for the first time. This was also the year of his first Royal Ascot winner - I'm So Lucky in the 2006 Wolferton Handicap. Then, in 2007, he won the King Edward VII Stakes at the Royal meeting on Boscobel, a horse on which he'd also won the Listed Glasgow Stakes at Hamilton. Earlier in that same season, he won the Lincoln on Very Wise for William Haggas. However, also in 2007, he broke two vertebrae in his back when falling at Goodwood and was out for seven months.

Other Royal Ascot victories have come on Holberg (2009 Queen's Vase), Hartnell (2014 Queen's Vase) and two Queen Alexandra Stakes on Oriental Fox in 2015 and 2017.

His biggest single prize pot to date came in the Goffs Million Mile at The Curragh in September 2009 on Shakespearean, again for Johnston. He has won more than 100 races in Britain every season since then, with his highest total to date coming in 2012. Also in that period, he twice won the All-Weather Jockeys' Championship - in 2009/10 and 2011/12. In 2014, he surpassed £2 million in British prize money for the first time.

In September 2016, on his 46th birthday, he finally secured his first Group 1 victory on The Last Lion in the Middle Park at Newmarket by three-quarters of a length at 25/1, having won the Group 2 Sirenia Stakes at Kempton three weeks prior. Fanning later spoke of his satisfaction at winning a Group 1 after so many Group 2s and 3s "I wouldn’t have liked to face retirement without that Group 1 so I did have a feeling of relief," he said.

He reached a mark of 2,500 winners in Great Britain on 24 August 2019 with a win at Redcar on Universal Gleam for Keith Dalgleish. He is one of only two active jockeys to reach that total. Besides the above injuries, he has also broken collarbones in falls at Ayr and Hamilton and his heel at Wolverhapmton in June 2017. He has ridden a winner at every track in Britain and regards Kieren Fallon at his peak as the toughest jockey he has ridden against.

Relationship with Johnston

After Fanning won his first Group 1, his trainer Johnston remarked upon his loyalty, saying, "It's fantastic for Joe. He's ridden a huge number of winners for us over the years. He usually doesn't get the opportunity to ride in Group Ones. Hopefully he'll get a few more before he retires. He gives us loyalty. He came to us when he was just out of his apprenticeship. Many times he's been jocked off [i.e. the ride given to someone else] over the years and had to play second fiddle to a chain of jockeys. He never complains. He turns up every day and never lets us down. He's always been there for us when we need a jockey." 

For his part, Fanning disagreed. "It’s never nice being jocked off a decent horse; just because I don’t complain doesn’t mean it doesn’t bother me." However, he respects Johnston and restated his loyalty. "I haven’t ridden out for any other trainers in 20 years or so and I respect the loyalty he has shown me. It’s something that works both ways."

Statistics

Flat wins in Great Britain by year

Major wins 
 Great Britain
Ascot Gold Cup - (1) - Subjectivist (2021)
Middle Park Stakes - (1) - The Last Lion (2016)

 France
 Prix Royal-Oak - (1) - Subjectivist (2020)

Notes

References 

Irish jockeys
1970 births
Living people